Sa Pusod ng Dagat is a 1998 Filipino film produced and directed by Marilou Diaz-Abaya. It stars Jomari Yllana with Chin Chin Gutierrez and Elizabeth Oropesa. The film was critically acclaimed in local and international film festivals.

Plot
In a remote fishing island in the 1950s, Pepito (Jomari Yllana) grows up learning the trade of his mother, Rosa (Elizabeth Oropesa), the only midwife capable of delivering the newborn babies of their community. At first, the young son doesn't mind the unusual arrangement, but as he grows older, he begins to resist the role traditionally meant only for women.

In time, Pepito's coming of age intersects with the lives of other islanders whose beliefs and struggles become critical impetus to his maturity. Eventually, embarrassment and prejudices are overcome by acceptance and love between mother and son.

Cast
 Jomari Yllana as Pepito
 Elizabeth Oropesa as Rosa
 Chin Chin Gutierrez as Mrs. Santiago (as Chin-Chin Gutierrez)
 Pen Medina as Gusting
 Rolando Tinio as Apo
 Mia Gutierrez as Tale
 Tanya Gomez as Minda
 Manjo del Mundo as Mr. Santiago
 Ronnie Lazaro as Berto
 Jhong Hilario as Luis
 LJ Moreno as Sara

Production
Production of the film began in June 1997 under the working title Mga Bangka sa Tag-araw.

Awards and nominations
The film received nominations and awards from different local award-giving bodies. It got two Star Awards in 1999 for Cinematographer of the Year (Romy Vitug) and Original Screenplay of the Year (Jun Lana).

The film had received invitations from 17 prestigious film festivals abroad, an unprecedented achievement in the history of Philippine cinema.

"Sa Pusod Ng Dagat" is the country's official entry to the Singapore International Film Festival, Toronto International Film Festival, Hong Kong Film Festival, Fukuoka International Film Festival, Tokyo International Film Festival and Oslo Film Festival. It is an entry to the film festivals in London, Cairo, Bombay, Barcelona, Haifa and New York.

The film also made it to the Chicago International Film Festival, Montreal Film Festival, Nantes Festival of Free Continent and Chicago Film Festival. It was also the Philippine entry for Best Foreign Language Film in the Oscars.

References

External links

Cleveland International Film Festival

1998 films
1998 drama films
Films set in the 1950s
GMA Pictures films
Tagalog-language films
Philippine drama films
Films directed by Marilou Diaz-Abaya